Makhachkala Uytash Airport  is a civil airport located near Makhachkala and Kaspiysk cities. It is named after Amet-khan Sultan, World War II fighter pilot, twice Hero of the Soviet Union. The naming was found controversial by the Crimean Tatars, with whom Amet-khan openly affiliated, as an attempt to Detatarize his origins.

South East Airlines (formerly Dagestan Airlines) had its head office on the property of the airport.

Airlines and destinations

Accidents and incidents
 On 15 January 2009, 4 people died when two Ilyushin Il-76 aircraft collided and caught fire.
On 4 December 2010, South East Airlines Flight 372, a Tupolev Tu-154M carrying 160 passengers and 8 crew en route to Makhachkala, crash landed at Domodedovo International Airport, Moscow due to all engines failing. Two of the 160 passengers died.

See also 

List of the busiest airports in Russia
List of the busiest airports in Europe
List of the busiest airports in the former USSR

References

External links

Official website 

Airports built in the Soviet Union
Airports in Dagestan